Namibian Black German, also NBG, ("kitchen German") is a pidgin language of Namibia that derives from standard German. It is nearly extinct. It was spoken mostly by Namibians who did not learn standard German during the period of German rule. It was never a first language. It is currently spoken as a second language by people generally over 50 years old, who today usually also speak Standard or Namibian German, Afrikaans, or English. Along with general learning in the metropolitan environments of Southern Namibia where Namibian German is spoken, NBG may be preserved nominally through parent-to-child or in-house transmission.

History 
Colonial acquisition of German in Namibia often took place outside of formal education and was primarily self-taught. Like many pidgin languages, Namibian Black German developed through limited access to the standard language and was restricted to the work environment.

Currently several hundred thousand Namibians speak German as a second language – many, but not most of them Black, and while Namibian German often does not adhere to standard German, it is not pidgin.

Prepositions

English and Afrikaans have left an influence on the development of NBG, leading to three primary prepositional patterns:
adding a preposition where Standard German would use the accusative
dropping prepositions which are usually present in Standard German
changing the preposition that is required by the verb

Examples

Examples of phrases with Standard German equivalents:
 Lange nicht sehen - long no see ("Lange nicht gesehen")
 Was Banane kosten? - How much does the banana cost? ("Was kostet die/eine Banane?")
 spät Uhr - 'late hour', meaning 'it's late' ("es ist spät")
 Herr fahren Jagd, nicht Haus - "Master went hunting and he's not at home" ("Der Herr ist zur Jagd gefahren und ist nicht zu Hause")

References

Further reading 

Deumert, A. (2010). Historical Sociolinguistics in a Colonial World, Methodological Considerations [PowerPoint slides]. Retrieved from http://hison.sbg.ac.at/content/conferences/handoutsslides2010/Deumert3.pdf

Langer, N., McLelland, N. (2011). German Studies: Language and Linguistics. The Year's Work in Modern Language Studies, 71, 564–594. 

Stolberg, D. (2012). When a standard language goes colonial: Language attitudes, language planning, and destandardization during German colonialism. 25th Scandinavian Conference of Linguistics, Workshop 2: Foundations of Language Standardization. Retrieved from http://conference.hi.is/scl25/files/2012/06/Stolberg.pdf

German-based pidgins and creoles
Languages of Namibia
Germany–Namibia relations
German-Namibian culture